Valentina Petrovna Telegina (1915 — 1979) was a Soviet and Russian actress.

Biography
Telegina was born on February 23, 1915, in Novocherkassk, capital of Don Cossacks (now the Rostov Oblast).

In 1937, she graduated from the Leningrad Institute of Performing Arts, workshop of Sergei Gerasimov. Since 1937 the actress of Saint Petersburg Lensoviet Theatre, in 1940-1941 of the Baltic Fleet Theatre. In the cinema since 1934. She had her first big role as Motya Kotenkova in Sergei Gerasimov's film  Komsomolsk. 

After the war she moved to Moscow, working at the Gorky Film Studio from 1946.

She aimed to embody the character of the Russian woman in all its diversity.

Valentina Petrovna Telegina died on October 4, 1979. She was buried in Moscow at the Mitinskoe Cemetery.

Selected filmography
 Komsomolsk (1938) as Motya Kotenkova
 The New Teacher (1939) as Stepanida Ivanovna Lautina
 Member of the Government (1939) as Praskovya Telegina
 The District Secretary (1942) as Darya
 Springtime (1947) as Researcher
 The Train Goes East (1947) as Pasha
 The Precious Seed (1948) as Varvara Stepanovna Kurochkina
 Cossacks of the Kuban (1950) as Avdotya Khristoforovna
 The Village Doctor (1951) as medical orderly
 Sporting Honour (1951) as Vetlugina
 The Frigid Sea (1954) as Terentyevna
 World Champion (1954) as aunt Polya
 Sailor Chizhik (1955) as Avdotya Petrovna
  The Drummer's Fate (1955) as aunt Tanya
  Pavel Korchagin (1956) as moonshiner
It Happened in Penkovo (1957) as Alevtina
  The House I Live In (1957) as Klavdia Kondratyevna Davydova
 Ballad of a Soldier (1959) as Old woman truck driver
 Resurrection (1960) as Korablyova
 Farewell, Doves (1960) as Mariya Yefimovna
 Man Follows the Sun (1961) as woman reading a letter
 The Alive and the Dead (1964) as Kulikova
 Tale About the Lost Time (1964) as Avdotya Petrovna
 Three Poplars in Plyushcikha (1967) as Fedosia Ivanovna
 We'll Live Till Monday (1968) as school nurse
 Remember Your Name (1974) as nurse in hospital
 Step Forward (1975) as nurse in hospital
 The Luncheon on the Grass (1979) as cook in pioneer camp

Awards
 Honored Artist of the RSFSR (1961) 
 People's Artist of the RSFSR (1974)

References

External links 
 

1915 births
People from Novocherkassk
1979 deaths
Honored Artists of the RSFSR
People's Artists of the RSFSR
Russian State Institute of Performing Arts alumni
Soviet film actresses
Soviet stage actresses